Passport to Paris is a 1999 American direct-to-video film starring Mary-Kate and Ashley Olsen, who also serve as the film's executive producers. It is the first of seven direct-to-video films produced by Tapestry Films to star the Olsens.

Plot 

13-year-old twin sisters Melanie (Mary-Kate Olsen) and Allyson Porter (Ashley Olsen) have only one concern: boys. Desperate for them to broaden their horizons and see the world, their parents send them to Paris, France to spend spring break with their estranged grandfather, Edward (Peter White), who's the American Ambassador to France.

Expecting a fun time with their grandfather, they instead end up living day-to-day via a mundane itinerary with his no-nonsense assistant, Jeremy Bluff (Matt Winston), since Edward's always too busy with his ambassadorial duties to spend time with them. They also learn some harsh rules while staying at his swanky mansion, which includes: no loud music, no jumping on the bed, and having to be dressed appropriately for dinner every night without being a minute late.

While out for lunch one afternoon, the girls meet and befriend Brigitte (Yvonne Sciò), a beautiful French fashion model, who agrees to show them the great sights of Paris. They also meet two charming teenage French boys, Jean and Michel (who become infatuated with them and give them roses), and find various ways to ditch Jeremy so that they can spend time cruising around the city on mopeds with the boys. One afternoon, the twins end up in police custody, along with Jean and Michel, for trespassing on private property. To their dismay, the girls are forbidden by Grandpa Edward to see the boys again.

At dinner one night, the girls challenge the French Foreign Minister, Monsieur De Beauvoir, and manage to convince him to accept an important proposal that was established by their grandfather, concerning clean drinking water for the Embassy. This puts Melanie and Allyson back in Grandpa Edward's good graces, and he allows them to once again see Jean and Michel, even allowing all four of them to attend a dance together where they have their first kisses.

When the time comes for the girls to return home, Grandpa Edward decides to take a much-needed break from his ambassadorial duties and accompany them—the intention being to spend time with his family (whom he hasn't seen for a long time) back in the United States.

Cast 
 Ashley Olsen as Allyson “Ally” Porter
 Mary-Kate Olsen as Melanie “Mel” Porter
 Peter White as Grandpa Edward
 Matt Winston as Jeremy Bluff
 Yvonne Sciò as Brigitte
 Ethan Peck as Michel
 Brocker Way as Jean
 Doran Clark as Barbara Porter
 Matt McCoy as Jack Porter
 François Giroday as Henri
 Jon Menick as François
 Robert Martin Robinson as Monsieur De Beauvoir
 Laura Julian as Madame De Beauvoir
 Logan Robbins as Kyle
 Matt Freund as Shane
 Sian Bentson as Darlene
 Katrina Darrell as Katie/Helene
 Michael Immel as Mr. Harper
 Kevin Fabian as Pizza Hut Delivery Guy
 Stéphane Dausse as Snooty Bistro Waiter
 Ariane Seguillion as Cafe Waitress
 Richard Chevallier as French Police Officer
 Isabelle Patay as Museum Tour Guide

References

External links
 
 Passport to Paris website

1999 direct-to-video films
American direct-to-video films
Warner Bros. direct-to-video films
Films set in Paris
Films about twin sisters
American children's films
Films directed by Alan Metter
Twins in American films
1990s English-language films
1990s American films